World Sleep Day (the Friday before the northern hemisphere  vernal equinox) is an annual event organized by the World Sleep Day Committee of the World Sleep Society, formerly World Association of Sleep Medicine (WASM), since 2008. The goal is to celebrate the benefits of good and healthy sleep and to draw society's attention to the burden of sleep problems and their medical, educational, and social aspects, and to promote the prevention and management of sleep disorders.

Sleeplessness 
It was estimated in 2019 that sleep deprivation cost the US over $400 billion a year with Japan losing $138 billion, Germany $60 billion, the UK $50 billion, and Canada $21 billion.

In an article in The Guardian in 2019, World Sleep Day was criticized as helping to turn sleep into a commodity and pushing the idea that everyone should aspire to a single unbroken block of sleep, an idea which historians say is a recent invention.

Annual celebration

World Sleep Day is observed annually on the Friday before the March Equinox. The first World Sleep Day was held on 14 March 2008. Events involving discussions, presentations of educational materials and exhibitions take place around the world and online.

References

Sleep
Health awareness days